August 25 - Eastern Orthodox liturgical calendar - August 27

All fixed commemorations below are observed on September 8 by Orthodox Churches on the Old Calendar.

For August 26, Orthodox Churches on the Old Calendar commemorate the Saints listed on August 13.

Saints

 Martyrs Adrian and Natalia of Nicomedia, and 23 companions (306)
 Martyrs Atticus and Sissinius, by the sword.
 Martyr Adrian, son of Roman Emperor Probus, at Nicomedia (320)
 Saint Gelasius.
 Saint Maximus III, Archbishop of Jerusalem (347)  (see also: May 9)
 Venerable Tithoes of the Thebaid (4th century), disciple of St. Pachomius the Great.
 Monk Ioasaph, Prince of India (4th century)  (see also: November 19)
 Venerable Ibestion the Confessor, Egyptian ascetic (c. 450)

Pre-Schism Western saints

 Saint Zephyrinus, Pope of Rome from 199 to 217, who defended Orthodox Christology against heresies (217)
 Martyrs Irenaeus and Abundius (258)  (see also: August 13)
 Saint Secundus, a soldier of the Theban Legion martyred near Ventimiglia in Italy (3rd century)
 Saint Alexander of Bergamo (c. 303)
 Saint Ninian, Apostle to the Southern Picts (432)
 Saint Rufinus, Bishop of Capua (5th century)
 Saint Elias of Syracuse, a monk who became Bishop of Syracuse in Sicily (660)
 Saint Felix of Pistoia, a holy hermit in Pistoia in Tuscany in Italy (9th century)
 Saint Pandwyna (Pandionia), a holy virgin born in Ireland (c. 904)
 Saint Victor (Vitores),  a priest in Spain martyred by the Moors in the ninth or tenth century.

Post-Schism Orthodox saints

 Saint Zer-Jacob, missionary of Ethiopia.
 Saint Adrian of Uglich (after 1504), disciple of St. Paisius of Uglich.
 Saint Adrian of Ondrusov, founder of Ondrusov Monastery, Karelia (1549)
 Blessed Cyprian of Storozhev, former outlaw (16th century)
 Saint Maria (Fedina) of Diveyevo, Fool-for-Christ (1931)

New martyrs and confessors

 New Hieromartyr Peter Levlev, Priest (1918)
 George Kossov of Orlov (1928)
 New Hieromartyr Nectarius (Trezvinsky), Bishop of Yaransk (1937)
 New Hiero-confessor Roman Medved of Moscow, Archpriest (1937)
 New Hieromartyr Victor Ellansky, Priest (1937)
 New Martyrs Demetrius Morozov and Peter Bordan (1937)

Other commemorations

 Commemoration of the Meeting of the "Vladimir" Icon of the Most Holy Theotokos (1395)
 Icon of the Mother of God "Virgin of Tenderness" of the Pskov Caves (1524).
 Finding of the relics (1748) of St. Bassian, Schemamonk of Alatyr Monastery  (c. 1698)
 Miraculous Self-Renewal of the Vladimir Icon of the Most Holy Theotokos in the hands of Righteous Abbess Rufina, in Harbin, Manchuria (1925)

Icon gallery

Notes

References

Sources
 August 26 / September 8. Orthodox Calendar (PRAVOSLAVIE.RU).
 September 8 / August 26. Holy Trinity Russian Orthodox Church (A parish of the Patriarchate of Moscow).
 August 26. OCA - The Lives of the Saints.
 The Autonomous Orthodox Metropolia of Western Europe and the Americas (ROCOR). St. Hilarion Calendar of Saints for the year of our Lord 2004. St. Hilarion Press (Austin, TX). p. 63.
 The Twenty-Sixth Day of the Month of August. Orthodoxy in China.
 August 26. Latin Saints of the Orthodox Patriarchate of Rome.
 The Roman Martyrology. Transl. by the Archbishop of Baltimore. Last Edition, According to the Copy Printed at Rome in 1914. Revised Edition, with the Imprimatur of His Eminence Cardinal Gibbons. Baltimore: John Murphy Company, 1916. pp. 258-259.
 Rev. Richard Stanton. A Menology of England and Wales, or, Brief Memorials of the Ancient British and English Saints Arranged According to the Calendar, Together with the Martyrs of the 16th and 17th Centuries. London: Burns & Oates, 1892. pp. 413-414.

 Greek Sources
 Great Synaxaristes:  26 ΑΥΓΟΥΣΤΟΥ. ΜΕΓΑΣ ΣΥΝΑΞΑΡΙΣΤΗΣ.
  Συναξαριστής. 26 Αυγούστου. ECCLESIA.GR. (H ΕΚΚΛΗΣΙΑ ΤΗΣ ΕΛΛΑΔΟΣ).

 Russian Sources
  8 сентября (26 августа). Православная Энциклопедия под редакцией Патриарха Московского и всея Руси Кирилла (электронная версия). (Orthodox Encyclopedia - Pravenc.ru).

August in the Eastern Orthodox calendar